Ruslan Yevheniiovych Demchak (born 5 July 1974) is a Ukrainian businessman, politician, and diplomat currently serving as counsellor to the embassy of Ukraine in South Korea. He previously served as a People's Deputy of Ukraine from 27 November 2014 to 29 August 2019, representing Ukraine's 18th electoral district. Demchak is a member of European Solidarity.

Biography 
After graduating from school in 1991, Ruslan Demchak entered the Ukrainian Transport University, where he studied Mechanical Engineering until 1996. In 1997 Demchak started his studies of Accounting and Audit at the Interdisciplinary Institute of Management. In 2001 he was awarded an Economist diploma.

From 2001 to 2005, Demchak studied at the National Academy of Public Administration, where he completed his master's thesis "State regulation of the stock market of Ukraine" at the department of economic theory and economic history and was awarded a Doctor of Philosophy in Public policy & Administration (PhD).

In October 2009, Ruslan Demchak started his PhD at the National Institute for Strategic Studies. His thesis subject was "Fiscal decentralisation as a factor of economic security of the state."

In December 2010, Demchak became a Chairman of the Federation of Employers of Kyiv (FEK). 

In November 2014, Ruslan Demchak was elected as a People's Deputy of Ukraine. In 2021 became the Counsellor for economic issues of the Embassy of Ukraine in the Republic of Korea.

Activities 
Ruslan Demchak started his business in the stock market in 1997. Ruslan Demchak founded Corporation «Ukrainian Business Group» (multinational holding company). In 2011 he transferred the control of the UBG Corporation to the managers of the organisation in order to participate in public activities.

The UBG Corporation has considerable experience in managing businesses in various industries including finance, manufacturing, medical services, agriculture, media and information technology sectors. The most successful project is "Dobrobut" Medical Network, the largest network of private clinics in Ukraine to the day.  

In 2011 Ruslan Demchak established a representative office of UBG Corporation in London, Ukrainian Business Centre in London (UBCL).

Ruslan Demchak is also actively engaged in other public activities. In 2010 he became chairman of the Federation of Employers (FEK) of Kyiv. The FEK consists of 22 local and industry organisations of employers that bring together over 3,000 legal entities and public organisations, which employ more than 150,000 people in Kyiv.

The Deputy Chairman of the Financial Policy and Banking Committee of Parliament of Ukraine and an author of a number of laws of Ukraine in the financial and other areas.

References

External links 
 Ruslan Demchak's Card on website Verkhovna Rada 
 Official website 

1974 births
Living people
National Academy of State Administration alumni
Eighth convocation members of the Verkhovna Rada
Petro Poroshenko Bloc politicians
Kiev National Transportation University alumni